Afro-Antiguans and Afro-Barbudans are Antiguans and Barbudans of entirely or predominantly African (notably West African) ancestry.

According to the 2013 Census, 91% of Antigua and Barbuda's population is Black and 4.4% is Mulatto.

Origins 
Most of the enslaved Africans brought to Antigua and Barbuda disembarked from the Bight of Biafra (22,000 Africans) and the Gold Coast (16,000 Africans). Other African slaves came from the Windward Coast (11,000 Africans), the West Central Africa (9,000 Africans), the Bight of Benin (6,000 Africans), Senegambia (5,000 Africans), Guinea and Sierra Leone (4,000 Africans).

History 
Settlers raised tobacco, indigo, ginger, and sugarcane as cash crops. Sir Christopher Codrington established the first large sugar estate in Antigua in 1674, and leased Barbuda to raise provisions for his plantations. In the fifty years after Codrington established his initial plantation, the sugar industry became so profitable that many farmers replaced other crops with sugar, making it the economic backbone of the islands. Codrington and others brought slaves from Africa's western coast to work the plantations. Africans started arriving in Antigua and Barbuda in large numbers during the 1670s; they soon became the largest racial group of Antigua and Barbuda.

With all others in the British Empire, Antiguan and Barbudan slaves were emancipated in 1834, but remained economically dependent upon the plantation owners. Economic opportunities for the new freedmen were limited by a lack of surplus farming land, no access to credit, and an economy built on agriculture rather than manufacturing. Poor labour conditions persisted until 1939, when a member of a royal commission urged the formation of a trade union movement.

In the 20th-century was redefined the role of Afro–Antiguans and Barbudans. The colonial social structure gradually started to be phased out with the introduction of universal education and better economic opportunities.

Statistics by Parish

References and footnotes 

Afro-Caribbean
Antigua and Barbuda people of African descent
Ethnic groups in Antigua and Barbuda
People of African descent